Shediac Bridge-Shediac River is a local service district in the Canadian province of New Brunswick. The small local service district is located in Shediac Parish, Westmorland County, and Dundas Parish, Kent County, straddling the lower reaches of the Shediac River.

History

Notable people

Notes

References

Communities in Greater Shediac
Communities in Westmorland County, New Brunswick
Designated places in New Brunswick
Local service districts of Westmorland County, New Brunswick